The Building at 171–177 Clinton Street, also known as Bruun and Co. and Afga Ansco, No. 99, is a historic commercial building located at Binghamton in Broome County, New York. It is a two-story, two part brick commercial block built in 1920.  The first floor is divided into four storefronts and the second floor contains the remnants of offices and apartments.  The building was purchased in the 1940s by General Aniline & Film and housed a number of GAF offices and facilities.

It was listed on the National Register of Historic Places in 2002.

References

Buildings and structures in Binghamton, New York
Commercial buildings on the National Register of Historic Places in New York (state)
Commercial buildings completed in 1920
Residential buildings on the National Register of Historic Places in New York (state)
National Register of Historic Places in Broome County, New York